Falling & Flying is the second studio album by Australian hip hop artist 360. The album was released on 30 September 2011 on Soulmate Records.

Writing and development
For 360's second studio album, he worked with producers such as M-Phazes, the 2010 winner for 'Best Hip Hop Release', and Styalz Feugo. In an interview with 'All Aussie Hip Hop', he stated: "I think when I write personal and honest music that's when I shine, and that's the angle I've taken with this new album. It's all real." He also referenced the title track, stating that he loved the lyric "even when I'm falling I'm flying", and thought it effectively summed up his outlook on life.

The album was described as a cross-genre album, with dubstep, electro and pop influences. For five out of the 13 tracks, he collaborated with other artists, including Pez, Josh Pyke, Gossling and N'fa.

Track listing

Sample credits
"Just Got Started" contains a sample of "1517" performed by The Whitest Boy Alive.
"Killer" contains a sample from "Alles Klar" by Ultravox.
"Falling & Flying" contains a sample from "Wendy Wakefield" performed by Bobby Whiteside, written by Don Addrisi and Rick Addrisi.

Personnel
Credits for Falling & Flying adapted from liner notes.
 Styalz Fuego – producer all tracks, instruments, additional vocals
 M-Phazes – co-producer track 1, producer tracks 12 and 13, instruments
 Hailey Cramer – additional vocals, track 1
 Kaleb Tirman – additional vocals, track 2
 Pez – additional vocals, track 3
 Saraya Beric – strings, track 4
 Josh Pyke – additional vocals, track 4
 '96 Bulls – producer, tracks 7 and 9
 Brett Wood – guitar, tracks 5, 6, 7, 8, and 9
 Luke Hodgson – bass, tracks 5, 6, 7, 8, and 9
 Jason Heerah – drums, tracks 5, 6, 7, 8, and 9
 Melbourne Gospel Kids Choir – additional vocals, track 5
 Brad Pinto – acoustic guitar, track 6
 Gossling (Helen Croome) – additional vocals, tracks 6 and 12
 Sean 'Sdub' Windsor – guitar, track 7
 Damian Smith – keys, track 12
 Gideon Preiss – keys, track 13
 Jade Webster – strings, track 13
 N'fa Forster-Jones – additional vocals, track 13
 Alexis Nicole – additional vocals, track 13

Reception

The album was received generally well, peaking at number 4 on the Australian ARIA Albums Charts. It was certified double platinum by the Australian Recording Industry Association (ARIA) for shipments of over 140,000 copies. Cameron Adams of the Herald Sun praised 360 for "standing out from the pack" because of the emotion behind his music. Adams called it a "refreshing antidote to every egotistical rap you've endured" and compared the "flow" of his title track to that of Eminem's "Lose Yourself".

Charts

Weekly charts

Year-end charts

Decade-end charts

Certifications

References

2011 albums
ARIA Award-winning albums
360 (rapper) albums